This is a list of windmills in Wales.

Locations

Anglesey
There were 49 windmills in Anglesey, the most of any county in Wales.

See List of windmills in Anglesey.

Carmarthenshire
There was one windmill in Carmarthenshire.

Ceredigion
There were four windmills in Ceredigion.

Conwy
There was one windmill in Conwy County Borough.

Denbighshire
There were three windmills in Denbighshire.

Flintshire
There were five windmills in Flintshire.

Glamorgan
There were twelve windmills in Glamorgan, not including the Titt engine.

Gwynedd
There were four windmills in Gwynedd

Monmouthshire
There were two windmills in Monmouthshire.

Pembrokeshire
There were nine windmills in Pembrokeshire.

Powys
There were two windmills in Powys.

See also
 Centre for Alternative Technology

Maps
 1878 Ordnance Survey

Notes

Mills in bold are still standing, known building dates are indicated in bold. Text in italics denotes indicates that the information is not confirmed, but is likely to be the case stated.

References

Windmills
 
Wales
Windmills